Dulhan Chahi Pakistan Se 2 is a 2018 Indian Bhojpuri-language action romance drama film written, directed and produced by Rajkumar R. Pandey with co-produced by Krishna R. Pandey, Antra Pandey and Aarna R. Pandey under banner of "Saideep Films". The film features Pradeep Pandey and Surabhi Shukla in lead roles and Bollywood actor Rahul Dev make his Bhojpuri debut with negative role. While Shubhi Sharma, Arun Bakshi, Sanjay Pandey, KK Goswami, Gargi Pandit, Shakeela Majeed,  Amit Shukla, Shubham Tiwari and Aditya Ozha in supporting roles. Monalisa make a special appearance in song "Susuk Susuk Ke Royi Thi". It is sequel of 2016 Bhojpuri film Dulhan Chahi Pakistan Se.

Cast
Pradeep Pandey as Raja Hindustani (first life) /Surya (second life)
Surabhi Shukla as Noor
Rahul Dev as Nawab Khan
Arun Bakshi as Rafeeq (Noor's father)
 Priyanka Pandit as Kiran
Shubhi Sharma as Chanda (first life)
 Sanjay Pandey as Commissioner
 Raju Shrestha as Lateef (Noor's Uncle)
 Ishrat Khan as Noor's Mother
 Pushpa Verma as Surya's Grandmother
KK Goswami as Guttan
Shakeela Majeed as Raja's Mother
 Anoop Arora as Dayanand (Raja's father)
 Shubham Tiwari as MLA Ramachal Pandey (Surya's father)
 Priya Sharma as Durga Pandey (Surya's Mother)
 Ramsujan Singh (Chaubey Ji) as Passport agent
 Prem Dubey as Pakistani Police officer
 Rajesh Dubey as Paltu (Yamraj's henchman)
 Deepak Sinha as Kiran's father
 Amit Shukla as Yamraj
 Arun Singh as Yamraj's henchman
Aditya Ojha as Dharmendra Mishra (army officer)
 Gunjan Kapoor as Dharmendra's Wife
 Bijendra Singh as Surya's friend
 Raj Yadav as Inspector
 Priyanka Singh as Reporter
Monalisa as Special appearance in song "Susuk Susuk Ke Royi Thi"

Production
Filming of this film was done in Halol and Vadodara in Gujarat and Mandawa in Rajasthan with some scenes shot in Green Villa, Nandan Van, Uttan, Vasinesth and China Creak in Mumbai. Many Bollywood actor like Rahul Dev, Arun Bakshi, Raju Shrestha, K. K. Goswami and Ramsujan Singh (Chaubey Ji) are part of this film.

Publicity designer of this film are Shakti Art (Narsu Bahera) while dress designed by Purnima Bhatiya. Choreography is by Kanu Mukharjee, Rikki Gupta, Ram Devan and Raju-Shabana. Background music scored by Saajid Salaam while Drone operated by Santosh Rana. It was edited by Santosh Harawade while action direction by S. Mallesh. DI and VFX done by Jayesh P. Malkapure (Wot Studio Pune). Motion teaser and editing done Abhishek Srivastav (Reflection Pictures). The film got A certificate on 10 October 2018 from  Central Board of Film Certification.

Release
The film was theatrically released on 16 October 2018 on the occasion of Durga Puja at all theatres of Bihar and Jharkhand and experienced a successful opening with houseful theatres.

Soundtrack

The soundtrack for Dulhan Chahi Pakistan Se 2 was composed by Rajkumar R. Pandey with lyrics penned by Rajkumar R. Pandey, Ashok Kumar Deep, Shyam Dehati, Santosh Puri, Bimlesh and adhyay & Bittu Vidyarthi.The soundtrack included an unusually large number of songs at 9. It was produced under the "Venus Music" label.

Marketing
First-look poster of this film was released on 8 June 2018 and second on 16 June 2018 on occasion of Eid and created quite a flutter on social media. Motion poster released on 29 June 2018 at YouTube.

Trailer of this film was released on 22 August 2018 on occasion of Bakri-eid at Dhun Music's official YouTube channel of "Desidhuns" and got 6 million views on YouTube.

The film online stream on the Online video platform site YouTube on 30 August 2019 at Venus Music's official channel "Venus Movies Regional" and got 9 million views on  YouTube.

References

External links
 

2018 films
Indian sequel films
India–Pakistan relations in popular culture
Films directed by Rajkumar R. Pandey
2010s Bhojpuri-language films